Ben Peterson  is a Canadian social entrepreneur and venture capitalist. In 2002 he co-founded Journalists for Human Rights (JHR), a leading Canadian non-governmental organization (NGO), where he served as Executive Director until November 2011.  He now holds the position of Chair Emeritus at the charity. In January 2012, he co-founded Newsana, an online news community. He served as Newsana's CEO until September 2015, when the business was sold to a Toronto-based creative agency. He current holds the position of Senior Partner at AHL Venture Partners, an impact-focused venture capital firm in Africa.

Early life
Peterson is the son of former Liberal Premier of Ontario, David Peterson and Canadian actress Shelley Peterson. He is the nephew of Jim Peterson, former Canadian Minister of International Trade, and Tim Peterson, former Member of the Ontario Provincial Parliament, and Deb Matthews, a former Member of the Ontario Provincial Parliament, President of the Treasury Board and Deputy Premier of Ontario.

Peterson graduated high school from North Toronto Collegiate Institute. He holds a BA in Economics and a BAH in Political Studies from Queen's University (Kingston), and a MSc in Political Theory at the London School of Economics (LSE) where he played varsity basketball and studied under David Held.

While completing university Peterson worked for Canadian Minister of Foreign Affairs Lloyd Axworthy and for David Bonior, the Democratic Whip in the United States House of Representatives.

Time in Ghana
From 2001 to 2002 Peterson worked at the Ghanaian Ministry of Justice on an internship funded by the Canadian Department of Foreign Affairs and International Trade, where he helped write Ghana's reports to the UN on various international human rights treaties.

While in Ghana, Peterson met Alexandra Sicotte-Levesque, employed with a similar internship in Côte d'Ivoire, and created the idea behind JHR over MSN Messenger.

Journalists for Human Rights (JHR)
Peterson co-founded JHR with Sicotte-Levesque in 2002. JHR was founded with the mission of building the capacity of the African media to report more effectively on human rights issues.

Peterson and Sicotte-Levesque both lived in their respective parents' houses, taking no salary. JHR received start up funding from Foreign Affairs and International Trade Canada in 2003 to start a small project in Ghana.

Sicotte-Leveque left JHR in 2005, making Peterson the sole executive director. Sicotte-Levesque has since remained on jhr's advisory board and board of trustees.

Under Peterson's leadership, JHR grew into a leading media development organization, working in over 15 countries across Sub-Saharan Africa.

Peterson resigned from his role as the organizations Executive Director in November 2011. Upon his resignation he was appointed Board Chair, a role occupied until April 2013, at which point he was given the ceremonial title of Chair Emeritus.

Newsana 
Peterson founded Newsana in January 2012, in partnership with Jonathan Wong. Newsana is "an online community of experts and thought leaders who share, discuss and work together to choose the five most essential news stories and ideas of the day on the topics of their expertise." Newsana was sold to Toronto-based creative agency Relish Interactive in September 2015.

Honors
Peterson has been awarded the Action Canada Fellowship, Canada's Top 40 Under 40 Award, and the Queen's University Alumni Humanitarian Award for his work with JHR. The Toronto Star named Peterson one of the "People to Watch" in 2014. In 2016, Peterson was awarded the Meritorious Service Medal (MSM), one of Canada's highest civilian honours.

References

External links
Ben Peterson, LinkedIn

Canadian male journalists
Living people
Queen's University at Kingston alumni
Alumni of the London School of Economics
Year of birth missing (living people)